Florida State Road 5054, known locally as Sarno Road, is an east–west highway in central Melbourne, Florida (formerly Eau Gallie). Its western terminus is at Florida State Road 518, a half mile east of I-95; its eastern terminus is an intersection with Wickham Road and Sarno Road. The road is completely unsigned.

Route description
State Road 5054 begins at the intersection of Florida State Road 518, with the road taking a slight southeast turn before heading straight east through industrial and commercial land to the south, and the American Muscle Car Museum to the north, from the western terminus to Wickham Road.  East of Wickham Road, Sarno Road becomes CR 5054.

History
State Road 5054 is entirely composed of a former configuration of State Road 518. The section of Sarno Road west of the then-new West Eau Gallie Boulevard was renamed West Eau Gallie Boulevard.

Major junctions

References 

State Roads in Brevard County, Florida